Larceny is a 1948 American film noir crime film directed by George Sherman starring John Payne, Joan Caulfield, Dan Duryea and Shelley Winters.

Plot
Con man Rick Maxon (Payne) tries to swindle war widow Deborah (Caulfield) into giving up her savings for a non-existent memorial. When Rick falls in love with Deborah he has pangs of remorse, but he must contend with his gang boss, Silky (Duryea) and the tough-as-nails moll, Tory (Winters), who is enamored with Rick but is Silky's girl.

Cast
 John Payne as Rick Maxon  
 Joan Caulfield as Deb Clark  
 Dan Duryea as Silky Randall  
 Shelley Winters as Tory  
 Dorothy Hart as Madeline  
 Richard Rober as Max  
 Dan O'Herlihy as Duke  
 Nicholas Joy as Walter Vanderline  
 Percy Helton as Charlie Jordan  
 Walter Greaza as Mr. Owens
 Patricia Alphin as Waitress
 Harry Antrim as Mr. McNulty
 Russ Conway as Detective 
 Paul Brinegar as Mechanic
 Don Wilson as Master of Ceremonies

Production
This was the first movie appearance of character actor Paul Brinegar, as a mechanic near the end of the film.

References

External links
 
 
 
 

1948 films
1948 crime films
American crime films
American black-and-white films
1940s English-language films
Film noir
Films directed by George Sherman
Films scored by Leith Stevens
Universal Pictures films
1940s American films